Fut or FUT may refer to:

Language and linguistics 
 Fut language, spoken in Cameroon
 Futuna-Aniwa language, spoken in Vanuatu
 Future tense

Transportation 
 Fatuha Junction railway station, in Bihar, India
 Fung Tei stop, in Hong Kong
 Pointe Vele Airport, in Wallis and Futuna

Other uses 
 The Fut, a British rock band
 FIFA Ultimate Team, in the FIFA video game series
 Follicular unit transplantation
 Frente Unitario de los Trabajadores, an Ecuadorian trade union
 Fucosyltransferase
 Friendly user test, refers to software 'user testing' performed by people outside the development team, but known to the organisation that's conducting the testing.
 The area of the body between the anus and tailbone